Alamo City Comic Con (ACCC) is a pop culture convention that is annually held in downtown San Antonio, Texas, taking up the majority of the Henry B. Gonzalez Convention Center. ACCC brings top tier celebrities from the world of pop culture movies, TV, comics, video games and cosplay and is currently the largest convention in San Antonio as well as one of the largest events of its kind in the state of Texas. It is also one of the fastest-growing conventions in the United States, with approximately 73,000 attendees in 2014 and just over 78,000 in 2015. In 2014 director and producer Alejandro Cabrera followed and documented The Alamo City Comic Con and the surrounding community for his 2015 documentary, Syfytonians. The film was complete success locally and has credited for reinvigorating the company 2015 show turnover.

History
ACCC was started in 2013 by a passionate comic and pop-culture fan Alfredo "Apple" De La Fuente. In this first year, Alamo City Comic Con managed to attract just over 34,000 people. South Texas con-goers took notice of their first year with guests like The Walking Dead's Steven Yeun (Glenn), Lauren Cohan (Maggie) and Chad Coleman (Tyreese). Joining them were other high-profile guests Sean Astin, Danny Trejo, Adam West and Burt Ward, and comic creators Rob Liefield and Neal Adams to name a few. The convention nearly doubled its numbers in 2014, making it one of the largest comic book conventions in the country, with guest of honor Stan Lee, Agent's of S.H.I.E.L.D.'s Clark Gregg, more Walking Dead cast members like Scott Wilson, Chandler Riggs, Emily Kinney among others.
Year three of ACCC once again brought Stan Lee along with a Sons of Anarchy reunion that included Ron Perlman, Kim Coates, Tommy Flanagan, Mark Boone Junior, Ryan Hurst, Emilio Rivera and Michael Ornstein. In addition, celebrities Jon Bernthal, Michael Rooker, Ming Na Wen and director Robert Rodriguez joined the lineup.

Event history

References

External links

Comics conventions in the United States
Multigenre conventions
Gaming conventions
Recurring events established in 2013
2013 establishments in Texas
Annual events in Texas
Conventions in Texas
Culture of San Antonio
Festivals in San Antonio
Tourist attractions in San Antonio